Valery Sarychev (born 23 November 1984) is a Russian rower. He competed in the men's lightweight coxless four event at the 2004 Summer Olympics.

References

1984 births
Living people
Russian male rowers
Olympic rowers of Russia
Rowers at the 2004 Summer Olympics
Sportspeople from Voronezh